Charleston Chew is a candy bar consisting of marshmallow flavored nougat covered in chocolate flavor coating.  It was created in 1925 by the Fox-Cross Candy Company, founded by stage actor Donley Cross and his friend Charlie Fox. The candy was named after the Charleston, a popular dance at that time.

History
The company was purchased in 1957 by Nathan Sloane and later sold to Nabisco in 1980. Although Sloane did not invent the Charleston Chew, he did change the candy's original form, chocolate-covered vanilla nougat. In the 1970s, he introduced such new flavors as chocolate and strawberry. Warner-Lambert purchased Charleston Chew from RJR Nabisco in 1988, then Tootsie Roll Industries purchased the brand from Warner-Lambert in 1993.

Flavors and varieties
The candy is available in vanilla, chocolate, and strawberry flavors. At one time, there were three additional flavours; banana, grape, and cherry. "Mini Charleston Chews" are a bite-sized, similarly-shaped version of the candy bar, introduced in 1998. The original packaging for Charleston Chews was a grey box that had the brand name in a small red font at the bottom of the box.

In science and technology demonstrations
Charleston Chew candy bars have been used to demonstrate rheology to students in North American university geology labs.

In popular culture
In the adult animated sitcom The Life & Times of Tim, Charleston Chew is frequently mentioned throughout the series. When asked what would be Tim's epitaph, Steve Dildarian, the show's creator, replied: "Probably something like, 'Here lies Tim. He loved Charleston Chews.'"
In the animated sci-fi TV series Futurama, Charleston Chew is frequently mentioned (and advertised) by the head of Richard Nixon, who is the President of Earth.
In the Amazon Prime series The Boys, the Charleston Chew is mentioned by the character Annie (Starlight) as one of her three favorite candies.  The other two are Almond Joy and Bit-O-Honey.
In season 2, episode 13 of the sitcom Community, Charleston Chew is mentioned by the Dean a few times in the episode as a candy bar nobody likes.
In the 2001 Dr. Dre song "Forgot about Dre" Eminem raps “And I'm still loco enough to choke you to death with a Charleston Chew”

References

External links
Tootsie Roll Industries Charleston Chews product page

Chocolate bars
Candy bars
Tootsie Roll Industries brands
Products introduced in 1922